Gymnocalycium ochoterenae is a species of Gymnocalycium from Argentina.

References

External links
 
 

ochoterenae
Flora of Argentina